The Pittsburgh Blues and Roots Festival is a music festival featuring National and Local blues musicians in Pittsburgh, Pennsylvania. It is one of the region's "marquee annual concerts." The inaugural event took place at the Riverplex at Sandcastle Waterpark, and since then has been held at Hartwood Acres Park and at the Iron City Brewing Company factory. Proceeds from the event benefit charity. The Greater Pittsburgh Community Food Bank had been the recipient of the proceeds until 2017 when Band Together Pittsburgh, a local nonprofit that teaches those on the autism spectrum all about playing, writing, recording and even DJing music. They offer programs throughout the year to help those on the spectrum learn the magic of music. It is now held yearly at The Shriners Pavilion in Cheswick, PA and is held over two days in the summer.

Previous acts
Many musicians have previously performed at the Pittsburgh Blues Festival: Koko Taylor, Taj Mahal, John Mayall, Gatemouth Brown, Devon Allman, Bernard Allison, Guy Davis, and 
Robert Cray.

Kidzone
The kidzone is a fairly new attraction of the Pittsburgh Blues Festival. Thanks to a few of the event's many sponsors, the Kidzone tent at the festival accommodates a wide range of children activities including story-telling, face painting, musical presentations, and crafts. The kidzone also provides healthy snacks.

See also

List of blues festivals
List of folk festivals

References

External links
 Pittsburgh Blues Festival

Music festivals established in 1994
Festivals in Pittsburgh
Blues festivals in the United States
Folk festivals in the United States
Music festivals in Pennsylvania